Baronchelli is an Italian surname. Notable people with the surname include:

Bruno Baronchelli (born 1957), French footballer
Gianbattista Baronchelli (born 1953), Italian cyclist
Giuseppe Baronchelli (born 1971), Italian footballer and manager

Italian-language surnames